Argyrodendron trifoliolatum is an Australian rainforest tree. It is native to eastern Queensland and northeastern NSW, Australia, where it is known as white booyong. Booyong, New South Wales is named after the tree. It can grow up to 45 metres tall. Its flowers, produced from July to September, are in great numbers and are creamy-colored bell-shaped. The most distinctive feature of Argyrodendron trifoliolatum is that the trunks form large characteristic buttresses.

The natural habitats of the species are subtropical and dry rainforests and scrubby watercourses. It is a shade tolerant climax species and one of the main tree species in warm subtropical rainforests.

References

Sterculioideae
Flora of Queensland
Flora of New South Wales
Trees of Australia
Malvales of Australia
Taxa named by Ferdinand von Mueller